Sue Eddy (born 26 March 1953) is an Australian former swimmer. She competed in three events at the 1968 Summer Olympics.

References

External links
 

1953 births
Living people
Australian female freestyle swimmers
Australian female medley swimmers
Olympic swimmers of Australia
Swimmers at the 1968 Summer Olympics
20th-century Australian women